The Indian eyed turtle (Morenia petersi) is a species of turtle in the family Geoemydidae. The species is endemic to South Asia.

Geographic range
M. petersi is found in northeastern India (as far west as Bihar) and in Bangladesh.

Etymology
The specific name, petersi, is in honour of German herpetologist Wilhelm Peters (1815–1883).

Description
M. petersi is very closely allied to Morenia ocellata. The snout is much more pointed and relatively longer. The suture between the pectorals is not shorter than the suture between the abdominals. The carapace is black. Each vertebral has a narrow yellowish mesial line. The last four vertebrals have a yellowish linear horseshoe mark with both ends directed forward. All costals have an ocellus placed rather low and formed by a narrow yellowish line, above which are some irregular looped lines of similar colour. The nuchal and each marginal have a narrow, vertical yellowish mesial streak. The plastron is yellow. Three yellow streaks are on each side of the head, the lower one extending from below the nostril to the angle of the mouth.
Males can achieve a carapace length up to 5 in (about 12 cm); females can achieve a shell length up to 8 in (about 20 cm).

Type locality: Huzurapur (Jessore District), Faridpur, and Dhaka, Bangladesh

Reproduction
Mating of M. petersi occurs in the winter months, and nesting follows in April–May. A clutch is made up of two eggs 34.6–35 mm x 22 mm (1.4 in x 0.9 in).

References

Further reading
Anderson J (1879). Anatomical and Zoological Researches: Comprising an Account of the Zoological Results of the Two Expeditions to Western Yunnan in 1866 and 1875; and a Monograph of the Two Cetacean Genera Platanista and Orcella. London: Bernard Quaritch. Two volumes (Text: 985 pages [herpetology: pages 703-860, 969-975]; Atlas: 85 plates [herpetological plates 55-78, 75A, 75B]). (Batagur petersi, new species, pp. 761–764 + Plate 69).
Das I (1991). Colour Guide to the Turtles and Tortoises of the Indian Subcontinent. Avon, England: R&A Publishing. 133 pages.

External links
Photo of Morenia petersi

Reptiles of India
Morenia
Reptiles described in 1879